Mariana Dimitrova (1954–2005) was a Bulgarian actress born on May 28, 1954 in the small village of Kozarevetz, Veliko Turnovo region. She graduated from the Bulgarian film academy. Her second husband was the prominent Bulgarian director Eduard Zahariev. From 1997 to 2005 she lived in San Diego, California.

She played different roles in more than 30 Bulgarian movies, some of the most memorable ones in Manly Times, Ladies' Choice and My Darling, My Darling. She also took part in the Old Globe Theatre play Pentecost and in an episode of Six Feet Under. She wrote two books published in Bulgaria: American Syndrome and Curious Travelers. She committed suicide on June 1, 2005 by jumping from the eighth floor of a building.

Filmography 
 Bird of Prey (1995) (Хищна птица)
 My Darling, My Darling (1986) (Скъпа моя, скъпи мой)
 Green Fields (1984) (Зелените поля)
 Elegy (1982) (Елегия)
 Ladies' Choice (1980)  (Дами канят)
 Almost a Love Story (1980) (Почти любовна история)
 Be Blessed (1978) (Бъди благословена)
 Manly Times (1977) (Мъжки времена)
 Fairy Dance (1976) (Самодивско хоро)
 Doomed Souls (1975) (Осъдени души)

References

External links 

1954 births
2005 deaths
Bulgarian film actresses
Bulgarian stage actresses
Bulgarian voice actresses
Bulgarian emigrants to the United States
People from Veliko Tarnovo Province
2005 suicides
Suicides by jumping in California